Dendrobium chrysanthum (golden yellow-flowered dendrobium) is a species of orchid. It is native to China (Guangxi, Guizhou, Tibet, Yunnan), Indochina (Laos, Thailand, Myanmar, Vietnam) and the Himalayas (Nepal, Bhutan, Assam etc.).

References

chrysanthum
Flora of East Himalaya
Flora of Indo-China
Orchids of China
Orchids of Nepal
Plants described in 1830